Legius syndrome (LS) is an autosomal dominant condition characterized by cafe au lait spots. It was first described in 2007 and is often mistaken for neurofibromatosis type I (NF-1). It is caused by mutations in the SPRED1 gene. It is also known as neurofibromatosis type 1-like syndrome (NFLS).

Symptoms and signs

Nearly all individuals with Legius syndrome show multiple café au lait spots on their skin.
Symptoms may include:
 Freckles in the axillary and inguinal skin fold
 Lipomas, developing in adulthood
 Macrocephaly
 Learning disabilities
 ADHD
 Developmental delay
Features common in neurofibromatosis – like Lisch nodules (iris hamartomas diagnosed on slit lamp exam), bone abnormalities, neurofibromas, optic pathway gliomas and malignant peripheral nerve sheath tumors – are absent in Legius syndrome.

Cause

Legius syndrome is a phakomatosis and a RASopathy, a developmental syndrome due to germline mutations in genes. The condition is autosomal dominant in regards to inheritance and caused by mutations to the SPRED1 gene at chromosome 15, specifically 15q14 (or (GRCh38): 15:38,252,086-38,357,248). The gene in question demonstrates almost 100 mutations.

Mechanism
A mutated SPRED1 protein adversely regulates Ras-MAPK signaling, which is a chain of proteins in a cell that sends signals from the surface of a cell to the nucleus which in turn causes the symptoms of this condition.

Diagnosis 

Genetic testing is necessary to identify the syndrome. The DNA test is necessary sometimes, because symptoms may not be sufficient to definitely diagnose this condition.

Differential diagnosis
The symptoms of Legius syndrome and NF-1 are very similar; An important difference between Legius syndrome and NF-1 is the absence of tumor growths Lisch nodules and neurofibromas which are common in NF-1.

A genetic test is often the only way to make sure a person has LS and not NF-1; the similarity of symptoms stem from the fact that the different genes affected in the two syndromes code for proteins that carry out a similar task in the same reaction pathway.

Treatment

Management of Legius syndrome is done via the following:
 Physical therapy
 Speech therapy
 Pharmacologic therapy (e.g. methylphenidate for ADHD)
The prognosis of this condition is generally considered good with appropriate treatment.

See also 
 List of cutaneous conditions
 List of genes mutated in cutaneous conditions

References

Further reading
 
  Review

External links 
 PubMed

Genodermatoses
Developmental neuroscience
Neuro-cardio-facial-cutaneous syndromes
RASopathies
Syndromes